Lidsville is Sid and Marty Krofft's third television show following H.R. Pufnstuf (1969) and The Bugaloos (1970). As did its predecessors, the series combined two types of characters: conventional actors in makeup taped alongside performers in full mascot costumes, whose voices were dubbed in post-production. Seventeen episodes aired on Saturday mornings on ABC for two seasons, 1971–1973. The show was rebroadcast on NBC Saturday mornings the following season.

The opening was shot at Six Flags Over Texas. Otherwise, the show was shot at Paramount Pictures film studio in Los Angeles.

Production
Lidsville resembles an earlier British series, Hattytown Tales, produced by Hattyland Enterprises & FilmFair Ltd. in 1969, which used an almost identical concept but different characters and was produced in stop motion animation.

Like predecessors H.R. Pufnstuf and The Bugaloos, Lidsville ran for only one season (1971–1972), with reruns airing the following year (1972–1973). Also like H.R. Pufnstuf, Lidsvilles title and subject matter were often interpreted as references to drug use: the word "lid" is slang for a hat or cap (as in "flip your lid"), but "lid" is also early-1970s slang for an ounce of cannabis (marijuana).

Like most children's television shows of its era, Lidsville contained a laugh track.

Plot
The show involved a teenage boy named Mark (Butch Patrick) who fell into the hat of Merlo the Magician (Charles Nelson Reilly), following his show at Six Flags Over Texas, and arrived in Lidsville, a land of living hats. The hats on the show are depicted as having the same characteristics as the humans who would normally wear them. For example, a cowboy hat would act and speak like a cowboy. The characters' houses were also hat-shaped.

The villain of the show was a magician named Horatio J. HooDoo (also played by Charles Nelson Reilly in a magician's costume and make-up). The vain, short-tempered, but somewhat naive HooDoo flew around in his Hatamaran, blasting the good citizens of Lidsville with bolts of magic (referred to as "zapping") and keeping them in fear, demanding that they pay him their Hat Tax. Mark helped the good hats resist as he attempted to find a way back home. HooDoo, trying to reclaim control of the androgynous Weenie the Genie from Mark, often enlisted the services of four Bad Hats. Mark was seen as a suspected spy against HooDoo on behalf of the good hat people and was captured at Derby Dunes by HooDoo's minions the Bad Hats the moment he had fallen into the world of Lidsville. He escapes from his clutches alongside a genie named Weenie (Billie Hayes).

In his high hat home, HooDoo was constantly besieged by the taunting music of his Hat Band, as well as all of his talking knickknacks (Parrot, Mr. Skull, mounted alligator head, the sawed-in-half lady, etc.). HooDoo also experienced further aggravation at the hands of his aides, the dimwitted Raunchy Rabbit and his two-faced card guard Jack of Clubs. HooDoo watched the action going on in downtown Lidsville from his hat home by using his Evil Eye, a device similar to a TV set that resembled an eyeball. He also had a hot chatline phone. The show relied on an endless array of puns based on hats. One such pun was "Derby Dunes", an area in Lidsville which sand dunes were shaped like derby hats.

Many of the episodes were about Mark trying to get back home, but the evil HooDoo prevented him from leaving. Weenie, being a nervous bumbler, was in fact a genie, but many of the tricks and spells did not work correctly anymore after being a slave to HooDoo for so long.

In the show's final episode, scenes from some of the past episodes were featured as HooDoo's mother (played by Muriel Landers, but not listed in the closing credits) had paid a visit to find out what has been going on in Lidsville while making sure that her son is still bad. Unfortunately for Mark, he did not return home at the end.

Music was also a part of the show, with songs being performed by the characters in several episodes.

Characters
 Mark (portrayed by Butch Patrick) – A teenage boy who serves as the main protagonist of the series. He fell into the hat of Merlo the Magician and ended up in Lidsville.
 Weenie the Genie (portrayed by Billie Hayes) – A genie who befriends Mark.
 Horatio J. HooDoo (portrayed by Charles Nelson Reilly) – An evil magician who serves as the primary antagonist of the series. Most of his plans involve trying to prevent Mark from leaving Lidsville and attempting to reclaim Weenie.
 Raunchy Rabbit (performed by Sharon Baird, voiced by Walker Edmiston impersonating Frank Fontaine) – A dimwitted rabbit who serves as Horatio J. HooDoo's henchman. Wears a fez.
 Jack of Clubs (voiced by Walker Edmiston impersonating Frank Nelson) – A walking deck of playing cards with a Jack-of Clubs as the face card. Wears a clubbed crown. Both top and bottom heads can talk.
 The Bad Hats – A group of four hats who work for HooDoo.
 Mr. Big (performed by Angelo Rossitto, voiced by Lennie Weinrib) – A gangster fedora who is the leader of the Bad Hats. Despite his name, he is one of the shortest of the Bad Hats.
 Captain Hooknose (voiced by Lennie Weinrib) – A pirate hat. Literally has a hook in place of a nose. 
 Bela (voiced by Walker Edmiston impersonating Béla Lugosi) – A vampire hat. A bat-eared top hat with a fanged brim on top of a cowl-like body.
 Boris (performed by Jerry Maren, voiced by Walker Edmiston impersonating Peter Lorre) – An executioner's hood. Usually carries an axe. (Also referred to as "Eggbert" or "Chauncey" throughout the series.)
 Imperial Wizard (voiced by Walker Edmiston) – The Imperial Wizard is an evil wizard who is HooDoo's master.
 Rah-Rah (portrayed by Jerry Maren, voiced by Lennie Weinrib) – A football helmet. "Dumb Jock" persona, but often comes through in a pinch.
 Madame Ring-a-Ding (voiced by Joan Gerber) – A party hat with a party favor nose who serves as Lidsville's social director.
 Mother Wheels (voiced by Joan Gerber) – An elderly, grey-haired motorcycle helmet dressed in black leather and usually on a motorcycle. Her catchphrase is "Hiya, Hon-ees".
 Nursie (performed by Joy Campbell, voiced by Joan Gerber)  – A bespectacled nurse's hat who is the closest thing Lidsville has to a doctor.
 Twirly (performed by Joy Campbell, voiced by Joan Gerber) – A beanie hat. Apparently the youngest member of the cast, he speaks with a little boy voice and can use his propeller to fly.
 Colonel Poom (performed by Felix Silla, voiced by Lennie Weinrib in a British accent) – A pith helmet who is the unofficial leader of the good hats. Colonel Poom is an old hunter/explorer.
 Mr. Chow (voiced by Lennie Weinrib in a Chinese accent) – A chef's toque with a long Manchurian moustache. Lidsville's top cook/baker.
 Pierre LeSewer (voiced by Lennie Weinrib) – One of the few good hat cast members who is a human. Lives in the Lidsville sewers and pops his head out from under the manhole covers which resemble French berets. It was never explained in the series why he cannot leave the sewers.
 Scorchy (voiced by Joan Gerber) – A talking, walking, fire hydrant with a long hose for a nose who wears a firefighter's hat. Serves as Lidsville's warning system.
 Tex (voiced by Lennie Weinrib impersonating John Wayne) – A cowboy hat.
 Tonsilini (performed by Van Snowden, voiced by Lennie Weinrib) – An opera-singing hat. Sings every line of his dialogue.
 Hiram (voiced by Walker Edmiston) – A farmer's straw hat.
 Little Ben (voiced by Joan Gerber) – A talking piglet that is usually carried by Hiram.
 Admiral Scuttlebutt (voiced by Walker Edmiston) – A green admiral's bicorne. Talks in old naval cliches.
 Big Chief Sitting Duck''' (voiced by Walker Edmiston) – A feathered Indian chief's hat. His body is covered by a thick Indian blanket.

Episodes
Season 1 & 2: 1971-1973

Home media
A three-disc complete series set was released on DVD in the United States in January 2005 by Rhino Entertainment. The set contained all seventeen episodes in digitally remastered, uncut and original broadcast form, plus interviews with Charles Nelson Reilly, Butch Patrick, and Billie Hayes. They and the Krofft brothers also provided audio commentary on some of the episodes.

Comics

Gold Key Comics published five issues of a Lidsville comic book. The books were a mix of new stories as well as re-workings of some of the television episodes.

Other media
 Characters from Lidsville were featured in the Ice Capades during the early 1970s.
 The show was parodied by HBO late night comedy program Mr. Show.
 Several audio samples from Lidsville can be heard in the song "Dope Hat" on Marilyn Manson's 1994 album Portrait of an American Family.
 At the beginning of "Jose Chung's 'Doomsday Defense'", an episode of Millennium, the writer Chung (played by Charles Nelson Reilly), mentions that he had a part in a "brilliant, award-winning film" as a small clip of HooDoo is played on-screen.

Film
On January 31, 2011, it was announced that DreamWorks Animation was adapting Lidsville to make a 3-D animated musical. The feature would be directed by Conrad Vernon, and the music would be composed by Alan Menken, known for composing multiple musical scores for Walt Disney Animation Studios films. Menken stated that, "The songs will be an homage to '60s psychedelic concept-album rock." In January 2013, he posted on Twitter that "Lidsville is underway... Finally." The lyrics would be written by Glenn Slater, a frequent Menken collaborator. In June 2016, Sid Krofft said in an interview about the project: "It was going to be like Hair or Tommy'', a full-blown musical. But they went in a strange direction and it just didn't work."

References

External links
 
 Sid & Marty Krofft.com

Audio
 Operation Space Nut - Audio: Clips (WAV)
 Stuck in the '70s - Audio: Butch Patrick Interview (Embedded in page WAV)

Video
 Robotkid - Video: Lidsville Remix (QuickTime)

American Broadcasting Company original programming
1970s American children's comedy television series
1971 American television series debuts
1973 American television series endings
Television series by Sid and Marty Krofft Television Productions
Hats
American television shows featuring puppetry
1970s American children's television series
Television series about teenagers